Eleven Stories is the fifth album by American singer/songwriter Bruce Robison. It was released in 2006 on Sustain Records.

Track listing
All songs (Robison) except where noted
“Every Once in a While” (Robison, Miles Zuniga) - 3:17 	   	
“Virginia” - 3:20 		
“Tennessee Jed” (Jerry Garcia, Robert Hunter) - 5:22 		
“More and More” (Webb Pierce) - 2:57 		
“Days Go By” (Robison, Miles Zuniga)- 3:56
“All Over but the Cryin'” - 4:39
“Don't Call It Love” - 3:36
“You Really Let Yourself Go” - 2:43
“I Never Fly” - 2:29
“Kitchen Blues” - 3:02
“Bandera Waltz” (Easy Adams) - 3:48

Releases

Reception

Ronnie D. Lankford Jr. of AllMusic felt that Eleven Stories was for listeners looking for an album that had reflective tracks. Matt Cibula of PopMatters called the tracks "fresh and fun".

References

External links 
Bruce Robison website

Bruce Robison albums
2006 albums